Super Relax is an EP by Cibo Matto released in 1997. Four of the nine tracks are versions of the song "Sugar Water" from the group's debut album, Viva! La Woman, and "Spoon" would later appear (in a reworked version) on Stereo Type A. Two of the remaining songs are covers, "BBQ" is a live recording, and "Crumbs" originally appeared on the band's first release, a 1995 self-titled EP. Super Relax was also the first release to feature new members Sean Lennon and Timo Ellis.

Track listing
 "Sugar Water" – 4:30
 "Sugar Water" (Mike D./Russell Simins/Mario Caldato Jr. Remix) – 4:35
 "Spoon" – 4:06
 "BBQ" – 4:57
 "Águas de Março" (Waters of March, originally by Antonio Carlos Jobim) – 3:16
 "Sing This All Together" (originally by The Rolling Stones) – 4:44
 "Sugar Water" (acoustic) – 6:53
 "Crumbs" – 3:04
 "Sugar Water" (Coldcut Remix) – 6:49

Notes

1997 EPs
Cibo Matto albums
Warner Records EPs
Albums produced by Mitchell Froom
Albums produced by Tchad Blake
Albums produced by Mario Caldato Jr.
Albums produced by Yuka Honda
Albums produced by Miho Hatori